La Voz de Michoacán is one of the leading daily newspapers in Michoacán, Mexico. It was established in 1948 by José Tocavén Lavín. The current editor (director general) is Álvaro Medina.

See also
 List of newspapers in Mexico

References

External links
 Official website
 Entry in kiosko.net
 Entry in prensaescrita.com

1948 establishments in Mexico
Mass media in Morelia
Michoacán
Newspapers published in Mexico
Publications established in 1948
Spanish-language newspapers